Mythimna guanyuana is a moth in the family Noctuidae. It is found in Taiwan.

References

Moths described in 1991
Mythimna (moth)
Moths of Taiwan